"Together We Belong" is the third single from the Kim Wilde album Never Say Never, released in 2006. The album contained new songs (including this one) as well as re-recorded versions of some of Wilde's 1980s hits. 

Released in Germany, the single contained the "Radio Edit" and the "Album Version" of the song, as well as a French version of You Came 2006. It also contained I Fly from the album Never Say Never.

CD-single format
1. Together We Belong (Radio Edit)
2. Together We Belong (Album version)
3. Tu me vas si bien / Because You Came (You Came 2006 French version)
4. I Fly 

Kim Wilde songs
2007 songs
Songs written by Ricky Wilde
Songs written by Kim Wilde
Songs written by Jörn-Uwe Fahrenkrog-Petersen